J Sports is a group of four sports satellite TV channels in Japan produced and broadcast by Jupiter Sports.  They are owned by

Coverage

Football

Soccer 
 FIFA
 National teams
 Men's:
 FIFA U-17 World Cup
 Women's :
 FIFA Women's World Cup
 FIFA U-20 Women's World Cup
 JFA
 Japan women's national football team

Rugby union 
 Japan Rugby League One
 Rugby World Cup
 Women's Rugby World Cup

Basketball 
 NCAA Basketball
 All Japan Intercollegiate Basketball Championship
 National Basketball Association

Baseball 
 Major League Baseball

Badminton 
 BWF
 BWF World Tour
 World Championships
 Teams
 Thomas Cup (men's championship)
 Uber Cup (women's championship)
 Sudirman Cup (mixed team championship)
 Individuals
Badminton Asia Championships

Volleyball 
 All Japan Intercollegiate Volleyball Championship

Ice hockey 
 Asia League Ice Hockey
 National Hockey League

Tennis table 
 ITTF Pro Tour

Cycling 
Tour de France
Tour de Langkawi

Wrestling 
New Japan Pro-Wrestling

Motorsports 
 Deutsche Tourenwagen Masters
 FIA World Endurance Championship
 FIM Endurance World Championship
 Formula E
 Super Formula
 Super GT
 Superbike World Championship

Programs 
.

References

ESPN media outlets
Television stations in Japan
Sports television networks
Japanese-language television stations
Television channels and stations established in 1992
Sports television in Japan